Laudakia stellio   is a species of agamid lizard. also known as the starred agama or the roughtail rock agama.

Common names
Common names for L. stellio include dikenli keler, hardim, hardun, kourkoutas (Cypriot Greek), kourkoutavlos, painted dragon, roughtail rock agama, short-toed rock agama, sling-tailed agama, star lizard, starred agama, and stellion.

Geographic range
Laudakia stellio can be found in Turkey, Greece, Israel, Cyprus, Lebanon, western Asia and northern Egypt; it has also been introduced to Malta.

Description

Behaviour and habitat
Like many agamids, L. stellio can change its color to express its mood. It basks on stone walls, rocks, and trees. It is usually found in rocky habitats, and is quite shy, being very ready to dive into cracks to hide from potential predators.

Etymology
The common name "stellion" comes from Latin stellio, stēlio (stelliōn-, stēliōn-), from stella, star. It may have referred to any spotted lizard.

Uses
For the indigenous people of Europe, and perhaps the Middle East, traditionally the excrement of the stellio was a popular medicine for the eyes, also used as a cosmetic, known as cordylea, crocodilea or stercus lacerti (i.e. 'lizard shit'), the faeces being imported to European pharmacies from the Levant – a rarer and more potent form was acquired from monitor lizards in olden days (stercus magni lacerti). The dung was used to improve one's eyesight, as well as take away any itches and cure cataracts (webbe).

Subspecies

The following 2 subspecies, including the nominotypical subspecies, are recognized as being valid.

Laudakia stellio daani 
Laudakia stellio stellio 

Nota bene: A trinomial authority in parentheses indicates that the subspecies was originally described in a genus other than Laudakia.

References

Further reading
Arnold EN, Burton JA (1978). A Field Guide to the Reptiles and Amphibians of Britain and Europe. (Illustrated by D. W. Ovenden). London: Collins. 272 pp. + Plates 1–40. (Agama stellio, pp. 110–111 + Plate 16 + Map 54 + map on p. 113).
Boulenger GA (1885). Catalogue of the Lizards in the British Museum (Natural History). Second Edition. Volume I. ... Agamidæ. London: Trustees of the British Museum (Natural History). (Taylor and Francis, printers). xii +436 pp. + Plates I-XXXII. (Agama stellio, pp. 368–369).
Linnaeus (1758). Systema naturæ per regna tria naturæ, secundum classes, ordines, genera, species, cum characteribus, differentiis, synonymis, locis. Tomus I. Editio Decima, Reformata. Stockholm: L. Salvius. 824 pp. (Lacerta stellio, new species, p. 202). (in Latin).

External links
European Field Herping Community

Laudakia
Reptiles of Cyprus
Reptiles of Europe
Reptiles of Turkey
Reptiles of the Middle East
Reptiles of Iraq
Reptiles of North Africa
Reptiles described in 1758
Taxa named by Carl Linnaeus